Monte Balmaceda is a heavily glaciated mountain located in the Magallanes Region of Chile. It stands at the head of Última Esperanza Sound, in the south portion of Bernardo O'Higgins National Park and near the mouth of the Serrano River. The glaciers Balmaceda and Serrano mantle the slopes of the mount.

In its vicinity is Torres del Paine National Park.

See also
 Puerto Natales
 Cordillera Riesco
 Cordillera Sarmiento
 Fjord of the Mountains

References

Mountains of Chile
Mountains of Magallanes Region